Gyankunj School, often said as Gyankunja or Gyankunj Education Foundation, is located at Ravibhawan, Nepal. Classes run from Kindergarten to Higher university Education.

History
The team of experts during the early months of 2046 had a talk to promote and develop the condition of education in Nepal. The school started in 2046 with the students around 70 in number. As the time passed by, the school too got developed to form larger and greater. With the provision of quality of education, the students, from local to regional, were lured with the commitments Gyankunj ensured. Every-year the school produces the finest students who, in their career, gets placement in different colleges and places.

The school began in 2046 with 70 students, initially teaching in Ravhibhawan. The school produced its first ever SLC batch in 2051.

SLC Trends
The Examination Board of Nepal, SLC, conducts SLC examination every-year and in this recent years, the Gyankunjians have produced the finest result which, indeed, is much helpful for the students to deserve scholarship in the Higher-secondary Level. The examination results are getting better as years are passing by. The Gyankunjians have got an excellent results in the last few years and especially for their results in the SLC exams. In the last year's result of SLC of 2015, 10 students successfully scored 100 in maths from the Khatmandu valley and there were 6 gyankunjians to score 100.

Montessori method
For the pre-school programme, the Montessori method is used, which is a scientific approach to education. It believes in creating a secure, happy environment in which children are eager to come to school. Children are active-experiential learners. They learn quickly by doing. They need a world rich in materials and varied learning experiences. Learning by doing is their innate attitude.

College and Higher Secondary
The education of Gyankunj minutely focuses on development of creativity within students. The subjects are offered according to the HSEB board's curriculum for 10+2(i.e. intermediate level studies standardized by HSEB Board). Students and Gyankunj are affiliated to Tribhuwan University. Students are offered courses up to Masters Level.

Sport
Games and sports are a major part of the school curriculum. To develop a healthy mind and a healthy body, outdoor and indoor games are provided to day scholars and boarders.

References

External links
http://www.gyankunjeducationfoundation.edu.np

Schools in Nepal